Novosibirsk-Yuzhny is a passenger railway station in Oktyabrsky District of Novosibirsk, Russia.

History
The station had been under construction since 1913.

In 1915, the station was built, traffic opened between Novonikolayevsk and Biysk.

The station complex included a station building with ancillary facilities, residential buildings for families of railway workers, a school, a medical center, a water tower, a locomotive depot.

In 2015, eight objects of the station were included in the list of identified cultural heritage sites of Novosibirsk Oblast: a passenger station, four residential buildings, an administrative building, a water tower and a warehouse.

Gallery

References

Yuzhny
Railway stations in the Russian Empire opened in 1915
Oktyabrsky District, Novosibirsk
Cultural heritage monuments of regional significance in Novosibirsk Oblast